Bill Souter (3 May 1931 – 24 August 2012) was a Scottish footballer, who played as a full back in the Football League for Chester.

References

Chester City F.C. players
Burnley F.C. players
Bangor City F.C. players
Association football fullbacks
English Football League players
1931 births
2012 deaths
Footballers from Dundee
Scottish footballers